Nathaniel Barclay DCM (1 October 1895 – 11 September 1962) was an Irish-born Australian politician.

He was born in Killeavy in County Armagh to farmer Jonathan Barclay and Alice Turner. He migrated to Victoria around 1914, and served in the Australian Imperial Force during the First World War, seeing action at Gallipoli and in France, where he was awarded the Distinguished Conduct Medal in 1917. On his return he was a soldier settler at Red Cliffs, where he grew dried fruit. On 6 December 1924 he married Daisy Florence Heritage. He returned to the armed forces during the Second World War, and before and after that conflict was president of the local Returned and Services League. In 1947 he was elected to the Victorian Legislative Assembly as the Country Party member for Mildura. He was defeated in 1952, and served on Mildura Shire Council from 1953 to 1962, with a period as president from 1958 to 1959. He returned to the Legislative Assembly in 1955 and served until his death at East Melbourne in 1962.

References

1895 births
1962 deaths
National Party of Australia members of the Parliament of Victoria
Members of the Victorian Legislative Assembly
Australian recipients of the Distinguished Conduct Medal
20th-century Australian politicians
Irish emigrants to Australia (before 1923)
Australian military personnel of World War I
Australian military personnel of World War II
Military personnel from Victoria (Australia)
People from Mildura
People from County Armagh
Victoria (Australia) politicians